Theodor Rosetti (5 May 1837, Iași or Solești, Moldavia – 17 July 1923, Bucharest, Romania) was a Romanian writer, journalist and politician who served as Prime Minister of Romania between 23 March 1888 and 22 March 1889.

1837 births
1923 deaths
People from Vaslui County
People of the Principality of Moldavia
Theodor Rosetti
Conservative Party (Romania, 1880–1918) politicians
Prime Ministers of Romania
Romanian Ministers of Culture
Romanian Ministers of Education
Romanian Ministers of Finance
Romanian Ministers of Interior
Romanian Ministers of Justice
Romanian Ministers of Public Works
Members of the Chamber of Deputies (Romania)
Presidents of the Senate of Romania
Members of the Senate of Romania
Governors of the National Bank of Romania
Romanian opinion journalists
Junimists
Honorary members of the Romanian Academy